Southworth Library may refer to:

 Southworth Library (Dartmouth, Massachusetts)
 Southworth Library (Dryden, New York)